Dorothea Rockburne DFA (born c. 1932) is an abstract painter, drawing inspiration primarily from her deep interest in mathematics and astronomy. Her work is geometric and abstract, seemingly simple but very precise to reflect the mathematical concepts she strives to concretize. "I wanted very much to see the equations I was studying, so I started making them in my studio," she has said. "I was visually solving equations." Rockburne's attraction to Mannerism has also influenced her work.

Career
In 1950 Rockburne moved to the United States to attend Black Mountain College, where she studied with mathematician Max Dehn, a lifelong influence on her work. In addition to Dehn, she studied with Franz Kline, Philip Guston, John Cage, and Merce Cunningham. She also met fellow student Robert Rauschenberg. In 1955, Rockburne moved to New York City where she met many of the leading artists and poets of the time. She was influenced by the minimalist dances of Yvonne Rainer and the Judson Dance Theater.

Throughout her career, she created paintings that expressed mathematical concepts. In 1958, a solo show of her work was critically and financially successful but deemed "not good enough" by Rockburne herself. She did not publicly show her work again for more than a decade, turning her attention to dance and performance art by 1960. Rockburne participated in performances at the Judson Dance Theater and took classes at the American Ballet Theater. During that time she supported her daughter, Christine, by working as a waitress and a studio manager for her friend Robert Rauschenberg. Bykert Gallery, in New York, which also represented Chuck Close and Brice Marden, began showing her work in 1970. Rockburne's series of installations, Set Theories, included works such as Intersection, which attempted to merge two of her other pieces of art (Group and Disjunction) to illustrate the mathematical concept of intersection. The series later led to her experimentation with new concepts and materials, such as Gold Section and carbon paper. In 2011, a retrospective exhibition of her work was shown at the Parrish Art Museum in Water Mill, N.Y., and in 2013, the Museum of Modern Art hosted a solo show of her drawings.

Rockburne is a member of the American Academy of Arts and Letters, National Academy of Design, and The Century Association. In 2016, Rockburne earned a doctorate degree at Bowdoin College.

Awards and honors

 2016 Bowdoin College, Brunswick, ME, Doctorate Degree
 2009 National Academy Museum & School of Fine Arts, Lifetime Achievement Award 
 2003, 2007 Pollock-Krasner Foundation, Lee Krasner Award
 2003 Art Omi International, Francis J. Greenberger Award
2002 Honorary Doctor of Fine Arts, College of Creative Studies, Detroit, Michigan
 2002 National Academy of Design, Pike Award for Watercolor 
 2002 National Academy of Design, Adolph & Clara Abrig Prize for Watercolor 
 2002 Pollock-Krasner Foundation Grant 
 2001 American Academy of Arts and Letters, Department of Art
 1999 American Academy of Arts and Letters, Jimmy Ernst Lifetime Achievement Award in Art
 1997 Alliance for Young Artists and Writers, Inc., Award
 1997 Artist in Residence, Bellagio Study Center, Italy 
 1991 Artist in Residence, American Academy in Rome
 1991 Rome Prize
 1986 Bard College, Annandale-on-Hudson, New York, Milton and Sally Avery Distinguished Professor
 1985 Brandeis University, Creative Arts Award
 1984 Skowhegan School of Painting and Sculpture, Visiting Artist
 1976 The Art Institute of Chicago, F.L.M. Witkowsky Painting Award
 1974 National Endowment for the Arts
 1972 Guggenheim Fellow 
 1963 Walter Guttman Foundation
 1957 Walter Guttman Emerging Artist Award
 1950 Black Mountain College, Asheville, NC, Entrance Scholarship
Ecole des Beaux-Arts, Montreal, Canada, Merit Scholarship
 Montreal Museum School, Montreal, Canada, Arthur Lismer Merit Scholarship

Exhibitions

Select solo exhibitions
 2014 Van Doren Waxter, New York, NY
 2013 Museum of Modern Art, New York City, NY
 2013 Jill Newhouse Gallery, New York, NY 
 2013 Icehouse Studio, Queens, New York, NY 
 2012 Craig F. Star Gallery, New York, NY 
 2012 Art Dealer's Association of America, The Park Avenue Armory, New York, NY
 2011 Parrish Art Museum, Southampton, NY 
 2011 The Drawing Room, East Hampton, NY 
2010 New York Studio School, New York, NY 
2003 Dieu Donné Papermill, New York, NY
2003 Jan Abrams Fine Art, New York, NY
2000 Greenberg Van Doren Gallery, New York City, NY
1999 Art in General, New York City, NY
1997 Ingrid Raab Gallery, Berlin, Germany
1996 Portland Museum of Art, Portland, ME
1995 Guild Hall Museum, East Hampton, NY
1994 Andre Emmerich Gallery, New York, NY
1992 Galleria Schema, Florence, Italy
1991 Andre Emmerich Gallery, New York, NY
1989 The Rose Art Museum, Waltham, MA
1988 Andre Emmerich Gallery, New York, NY
1987 Recent Paintings and Drawings - Arts Club of Chicago, Chicago, IL
1985 Xavier Fourcade, New York, NY
1983 Galleriet Lund, Lund, Sweden 
1982 Recent Watercolors and Drawings - Margo Leavin Gallery, Los Angeles, CA
1981 Locus - MoMA - Museum of Modern Art, New York City, NY 
1981 David Bellman Gallery, Toronto, Canada
1979 Texas Gallery, Houston, TX
1977 Galleria La Polena, Genova, Italy
1976 John Weber Gallery, New York, NY
1975 Galleria Schema, Florence, Italy
1975 Galerie Charles Kriwin, Brussels, Belgium 
1974 Galleria Toselli, Milan, Italy
1973 Lisson Gallery, London, England
1972 Galleria Bonomo Bari, Bari, Italy
1972 Galleria Toselli, Milan, Italy 
1971 Sonnabend Gallery, Paris, France 
1970 Bykert Gallery, New York, NY

Select group exhibitions
2020 University of Michigan Museum of Art, Ann Arbor, MI
2014 Paul Kasmin Gallery, New York, NY
2014 Gagosian Gallery, Paris, France
2014 The Drawing Room, London, England 
2013 Parrish Art Museum, Southampton, NY
2013 Bowdoin College Museum of Art, Brunswick, ME
2013 Yale University Art Gallery, New Haven, CT
2012 The Century Association, New York, NY
2012 Christie's 20th Floor Private Sale Galleries, New York, NY
2012 Brooklyn Museum, Brooklyn, NY
2011 The Art Institute of Chicago, Chicago, IL
2011 Gagosian Gallery, New York, NY
2010 Museum of Modern Art, New York, NY
2009 Virginia Museum of Fine Arts, Richmond, VA
2009 National Academy Museum, New York, NY
2008 Austin Museum of Art (AMOA), Austin, TX
2008 Museo de Arte Contemporanea de Serralves, Porto, Portugal 
2007 Museum of Contemporary Art, Los Angeles, CA
2007 ARCO (Arte Contemporaneo), Madrid, Spain
2006 National Academy of Design, New York, NY
2004 Greenberg Van Doren Gallery
2003 Cleveland Museum of Art, Cleveland, OH
2002 Reina Sofia Museum, Madrid, Spain
2001 Armory Center for the Arts, Pasadena, CA
2000 Neuberger Museum of Art, Purchase, NY
1999 Contemporary Arts Museum, Houston, TX
1995 The Aldrich Museum of Contemporary Art, Ridgefield, CT
1994 National Gallery of Art, Washington, D.C.
1993 Museum of Modern Art, New York, NY
1992 American Academy and Institute of Arts and Letters, New York, NY
1991 Centro Cultural/Arte Contemporanea, Mexico D.F., Mexico
1989 Museum of Modern Art, New York, NY
1988 Solomon R. Guggenheim Museum, New York, NY
1988 The Baltimore Museum of Art, Baltimore, MD
1987 Smithsonian Institution, Washington, DC
1987 National Museum of Women in the Arts, Washington, DC
1986 Philadelphia Museum of Art, Philadelphia, PA
1983 Galleriet, Lund, Sweden
1983 New Museum, New York, NY
1982 British Museum, London, England
1982 Whitney Museum of American Art, New York, NY
1981 Brooklyn Museum, Brooklyn, NY
1980 Venice Biennale, Venice, Italy
1979 Whitney Museum of American Art, New York, NY
1979 Phoenix Art Museum, Phoenix, AZ
1977 Museum of Contemporary Art, Chicago, IL
1977 Museum of Modern Art, New York, NY
1977 National Collection of Fine Arts, Smithsonian Institution, Washington, D.C.
1976 Baltimore Museum of Art, Baltimore, MD
1975 Corcoran Gallery of Art, Washington, DC
1974 Institute of Contemporary Art, London, England 
1973 Yale University Art Gallery, New Haven, CT
1973 San Francisco Museum of Art, San Francisco, CA
1973 Fogg Museum, Cambridge, MA
1972 Documenta 5, Kassel, Germany
1971 Whitney Museum of American Art, New York, NY
1970 Museum of Modern Art New York, NY
1952 Black Mountain College Gallery, Black Mountain, NC

Works 

 Fire Engine Red. 1967. Wrinkle finish paint (oil) on aluminum. University of Michigan Museum of Art, Ann Arbor.
 Scalar. 1971. Chipboard, crude oil, paper and nails. Museum of Modern Art, New York. 
 Locus. 1972. Series of six relief etching and aquatints on folded paper. Museum of Modern Art, New York. 
 Golden Section Painting #6. 1975. Kraft paper and blue pencil on linen. University of Michigan Museum of Art, Ann Arbor.

References

External links 
Official Website
Brooklyn Rail interview by Bill Bartman with Klaus Kertess and Dorothea Rockburne
"Dorothea Rockburne", New Art City
"Dorothea Rockburne", Saul Ostrow, BOMB 25/Fall 1988,
Interview with Phong Bui in Brooklyn Rail from October 2007
 Interview with David Levi Strauss and Christopher Bamford in Brooklyn Rail from July–August 2011

Canadian emigrants to the United States
Living people
1930s births
Canadian contemporary painters
Canadian women painters
Black Mountain College alumni
National Academy of Design members
20th-century Canadian women artists
21st-century Canadian women artists
Members of the American Academy of Arts and Letters